The 1965–66 St. John's Redmen basketball team represented St. John's University during the 1965–66 NCAA Division I men's basketball season. The team was coached by Lou Carnesecca in his first year at the school after Joe Lapchick's retirement. St. John's home games were played at Alumni Hall and Madison Square Garden.

Roster

Schedule and results

|-
!colspan=9 style="background:#FF0000; color:#FFFFFF;"| Regular Season

|-
!colspan=9 style="background:#FF0000; color:#FFFFFF;"| NIT

References

St. John's Red Storm men's basketball seasons
St. John's
St. John's
St John
St John